Bret Anthony Johnston is an American author. He wrote the novel Remember Me Like This and the story collection, Corpus Christi: Stories.  He is also the editor of the non-fiction work, Naming the World and Other Exercises for the Creative Writer. He won the 2017 Sunday Times Short Story Award.

Career
Johnston is a graduate of Miami University and the Iowa Writers’ Workshop.  He was the recipient of a National Endowment for the Arts Literature Fellowship. His work has appeared in The Atlantic, Esquire, The Paris Review, Virginia Quarterly Review, Oxford American, Tin House, The New York Times Magazine, The New York Times, Slate.com, All Things Considered, and in short story anthologies. Johnston teaches fiction writing at Michener Center for Writers at The University of Texas at Austin.

Johnston is the author of the novels Remember Me Like This and Corpus Christi: Stories.

In 2012, Waiting for Lightning premiered at the SXSW Film Festival and was released by Samuel Goldwyn Films.

Awards and honors
2006 National Book Foundation named a 5 under 35
2017 Sunday Times EFG Private Bank Short Story Award winner for Half of What Atlee Rouse Knows About Horses

Works

Corpus Christi: Stories (2004)
Naming the World and Other Exercises for the Creative Writer (editor) (2008)
Waiting for Lightning (screenwriter) (2012)
 Remember Me Like This (2014)

References

External links

 Official Bret Anthony Johnston website
 5 under 35: Laurie Ann Cedilnik interviews Bret Anthony Johnston & More in Gulf Coast: A Journal of Literature and Fine Arts (23.1).

Writers from Texas
American short story writers
University of Iowa alumni
Harvard University faculty
People from Corpus Christi, Texas
Living people
Year of birth missing (living people)
Miami University alumni